Due to various Parliamentary Acts the numbers of law enforcement agencies in the United Kingdom has varied drastically since the Metropolitan Police Act of 1829 set up the first modern police force in London.

There are currently over 60 law enforcement agencies operating in the United Kingdom.  See List of law enforcement agencies in the United Kingdom, Crown Dependencies and British Overseas Territories for these.

For former (non-police) law enforcement agencies, see :Category:Defunct law enforcement agencies of the United Kingdom. For defunct police forces, see :Category:Defunct police forces of the United Kingdom

England and Wales police forces

Abolished before 1889
The County Police Act 1840 allowed for borough police forces to voluntarily amalgamate with county constabularies.
Abingdon Borough Police, to Berkshire
Andover Borough Police (1846, to Hampshire)
Banbury Borough Police, to Oxfordshire
Bodmin Borough Police (1865, to Cornwall)
Bradninch Borough Police (1865, to Devon)
Chipping Norton Borough Police, to Oxfordshire
Henley Borough Police, to Oxfordshire
 Honiton Borough Police; (to Devon County)
Launceston Borough Police (1883, to Cornwall)
Liskeard Borough Police (1877, to Cornwall)
Lymington Borough Police (1852, to Hampshire)
Monmouth Borough Police (1881, to Monmouthshire)
Newbury Borough Police (1875, to Berkshire)
Okehampton Borough Police (1860, to Devon)
Romsey Borough Police (1865, to Hampshire)
South Molton Borough Police (1877, to Devon)
Tavistock Borough Police (1856, to Devon)
Thames River Police, absorbed into the London Metropolitan Police in 1839
Torrington Borough Police (1870, then again from 1878–1886, to Devon)
Torquay Borough Police (1870, to Devon)
Totnes Borough Police (1884, to Devon)
Wallingford Borough Police, to Berkshire
Wantage Borough Police, to Berkshire
Warwick Borough Police (1875, to Warwickshire)
Wolborough Borough Police (1859, to Devon)

Abolished under the Local Government Act 1888
The Act, which came into force in 1889 passed control of county constabularies to standing joint committees of county councillors and magistrates, and merged smaller borough police forces (where the town had a population of less than 10,000) with the county police.
Basingstoke Borough Police (1889, to Hampshire)
Bideford Borough Police (1889, to Devon)
Buckingham Borough Police (1889 to Buckinghamshire)
Deal Borough Police (1889, to Kent)
Falmouth Borough Police (1889, to Cornwall)
Faversham Borough Police (1889, to Kent)
Helston Borough Police (1889, to Cornwall)
Hertford Borough Police (1889, to Hertfordshire)
Hythe Borough Police (1889, to Kent)
Maidenhead Borough Police (1889, to Berkshire)
Newport Borough Police (1890, to Isle of Wight)
Penryn Borough Police (1889, to Cornwall)
Sandwich Borough Police (1889, to Kent)
Stratford-upon-Avon Borough Police (1889, to Warwickshire)
St Ives Borough Police (1889, to Cornwall)
Tenterden Borough Police (1889, to Kent)

Abolished 1890–1942

Barnstaple Borough Police (1921, to Devon)
Banbury Borough Police (1925, to Oxfordshire)
Berwick upon Tweed Police (1921, to Northumberland)
Bridgwater Borough Police (1940, to Somerset Constabulary)
Devonport Borough Police (1914, to Plymouth)
Hanley Borough Police (1910, to Stoke-on-Trent Borough Police)
Ryde Borough Police (1922, to Isle of Wight)
Stonehouse District Police (1914 to Plymouth)
Truro City Police (1921, to Cornwall. Prior to 1877 the force was called Truro Borough Police)

Abolished under the Defence (Amalgamation of Police Forces) Regulations 1942
NB – Some were re-constituted after the war but then abolished in 1946.

 Dover Borough Police (1943, to Kent)
 Folkestone Borough Police (1943, to Kent)
 Maidstone Borough Police (1943, to Kent)
 Margate Borough Police (1943, to Kent)
 Ramsgate Borough Police (1943, to Kent)
 Rochester City Police (1943, to Kent)
 Tiverton Borough Police (1943, to Devon)
 Tunbridge Wells Police Force (1943, to Kent)
 Winchester City Police (1942, to Hampshire Joint)
 Guildford Borough Police (1943 to Surrey)
 Reigate Borough Police (1943 to Surrey)
 Salisbury City Police (1943 to Wiltshire Constabulary)

Abolished under the Police Act 1946

Non-county borough forces
Accrington Borough Police; to Lancashire Constabulary
Ashton-under-Lyne Borough Police; to Lancashire Constabulary
Bacup Borough Police; to Lancashire Constabulary
Bedford Borough Police; to Bedfordshire Constabulary
Boston Borough Police; to Lincolnshire Constabulary
Carmarthen Borough Police; to Carmarthenshire Constabulary
Chepping Wycombe Borough Police; to Buckinghamshire Constabulary
Chesterfield Borough Police; to Derbyshire Constabulary
Clitheroe Borough Police; to Lancashire Constabulary
Colchester Borough Police; to Essex Constabulary
Congleton Borough Police; to Cheshire Constabulary
Glossop Borough Police; to Derbyshire Constabulary
Grantham Borough Police; to Lincolnshire Constabulary
Hartlepool Borough Police; to Durham Constabulary
Hereford Borough Police; to Herefordshire Constabulary
Hyde Borough Police; to Cheshire Constabulary
Isles of Scilly Police (1947, to Cornwall)
Kendal Borough Police; to Cumberland and Westmorland Constabulary
Kidderminster Borough Police; to Worcestershire Constabulary
King's Lynn Borough Police; to Norfolk Constabulary
Lancaster Borough Police; to Lancashire Constabulary
Leamington Spa Borough Police; to Warwickshire Constabulary
Luton Borough Police; to Bedfordshire Constabulary
Macclesfield Borough Police; to Cheshire Constabulary
Neath Borough Police; to Glamorgan Constabulary
Newark Borough Police; to Nottinghamshire Constabulary
Newcastle-under-Lyme Borough Police; to Staffordshire Constabulary
Peterborough City Police; to Peterborough Combined Police Force
Penzance Borough Police; to Cornwall County Constabulary
St. Albans City Police; to Hertfordshire Constabulary
Scarborough Borough Police; to North Riding Constabulary
Shrewsbury Borough Police; to Shropshire Constabulary
Stalybridge Borough Police; to Cheshire Constabulary
Windsor Borough Police; to Berkshire Constabulary

County borough forces
Chester City Police; to Cheshire Constabulary
Canterbury City Police; to Kent Constabulary

County forces

Anglesey Constabulary; to Gwynedd Constabulary
Breconshire Constabulary; to Mid Wales Constabulary
Caernarvonshire Constabulary; to Gwynedd Constabulary
Cardiganshire Constabulary; to Carmarthenshire and Cardiganshire Constabulary
Carmarthenshire Constabulary; to Carmarthenshire and Cardiganshire Constabulary
Isle of Wight Constabulary; to Hampshire Constabulary
Merionethshire Constabulary; to Gwynedd Constabulary
Montgomeryshire Constabulary; to Mid Wales Constabulary
Radnorshire Constabulary; to Mid Wales Constabulary
Leicestershire Constabulary; to Leicestershire and Rutland Constabulary
Liberty of Peterborough Constabulary; to Peterborough Combined Police Force
Rutland Constabulary; to Leicestershire and Rutland Constabulary

Abolished under the Police Act 1964
Borough forces
Bath City Police; to Somerset and Bath Constabulary
Barnsley Borough Police; to West Yorkshire Constabulary
Barrow-in-Furness Borough Police; to Lancashire Constabulary
Birkenhead Borough Police; to Cheshire Constabulary
Blackburn Borough Police; to Lancashire Constabulary
Blackpool Borough Police; to Lancashire Constabulary
Bolton Borough Police; to Lancashire Constabulary
Bootle Borough Police; to Liverpool and Bootle Constabulary
Bournemouth Borough Police; to Dorset and Bournemouth Constabulary
Brighton Borough Police; to Sussex Constabulary
Burnley Borough Police; to Lancashire Constabulary
Bury Borough Police; to Lancashire Constabulary
Cambridge City Police; to Mid Anglia Constabulary
Cardiff Borough Police; to South Wales Police
Carlisle City Police; to Cumbria Constabulary
Coventry City Police; to Warwickshire and Coventry Constabulary
Derby Borough Police; to Derby County and Borough Constabulary
Dewsbury Borough Police; to West Yorkshire Constabulary
Doncaster Borough Police; to West Yorkshire Constabulary
Eastbourne Borough Police; to Sussex Constabulary
Exeter City Police; to Devon and Exeter Constabulary
Gateshead Borough Police; to Durham Constabulary
Great Yarmouth Borough Police; to Norfolk Constabulary
Grimsby Borough Police; to Lincolnshire Constabulary
Hastings Borough Police; to Sussex Constabulary
Halifax Borough Police; to West Yorkshire Constabulary
Huddersfield Borough Police; to West Yorkshire Constabulary
Ipswich Borough Police; to Suffolk Constabulary
Leicester City Police; to Leicester and Rutland Constabulary
Lincoln City Police; to Lincolnshire Constabulary
Liverpool City Police; to Liverpool and Bootle Constabulary
Luton Borough Police (again); to Bedfordshire and Luton Constabulary
Manchester City Police; to Manchester and Salford Police
Merthyr Tydfil Borough Police; to South Wales Constabulary
Middlesbrough Borough Police; to Teesside
Newcastle upon Tyne Borough Police; to Northumberland Constabulary
Newport Borough Police; to Gwent Police
Northampton Borough Police; to Northampton and County Constabulary
Norwich City Police; to Norfolk Constabulary
Nottingham City Police; to Nottinghamshire Combined Constabulary
Oldham Borough Police; to Lancashire Constabulary
Oxford City Police; to Thames Valley Constabulary
Plymouth City Police; to Devon and Cornwall Constabulary
Portsmouth City Police; to Hampshire Constabulary
Preston Borough Police; to Lancashire Constabulary
Reading Borough Police; to Thames Valley Constabulary
Rochdale Borough Police; to Lancashire Constabulary
Rotherham Borough Police; to Sheffield and Rotherham Constabulary
Salford City Police; to Manchester and Salford Police
Sheffield Borough Police; to Sheffield and Rotherham Constabulary
St Helens Borough Police; to Lancashire Constabulary
Stockport Borough Police; to Cheshire Constabulary
Stoke-on-Trent City Police; to Staffordshire County and Stoke-on-Trent Constabulary
Southampton City Police; to Hampshire Constabulary
Southend-on-Sea Borough Police; to Essex and Southend-on-Sea Joint Constabulary
South Shields Borough Police; to Durham Constabulary
Southport Borough Police; to Lancashire Constabulary
Sunderland Borough Police; to Durham Constabulary
Swansea Borough Police; to South Wales Constabulary
Tynemouth Borough Police; to Northumberland Constabulary
Wakefield City Police; to West Yorkshire Constabulary
Wallasey Borough Police; to Cheshire Constabulary
Warrington Borough Police; to Lancashire Constabulary
Wigan Borough Police; to Lancashire Constabulary
Worcester City Police; to West Mercia Constabulary
York City Police; to York and North East Yorkshire Police

County/combined forces
Bedfordshire Constabulary; to Bedfordshire and Luton Constabulary
Berkshire Constabulary; to Thames Valley Constabulary
Buckinghamshire Constabulary; to Thames Valley Constabulary
Cambridgeshire Constabulary (original); to Mid Anglia Constabulary
Carmarthenshire and Cardiganshire Constabulary; to Dyfed-Powys Constabulary
Cornwall County Constabulary; to Devon and Cornwall Constabulary
Cumberland and Westmorland Constabulary; to Cumbria Constabulary
Derbyshire Constabulary; to Derby County and Borough Constabulary
Devon County Constabulary; to Devon and Exeter Constabulary
Devon and Exeter Constabulary; to Devon and Cornwall Constabulary
Dorset Constabulary; to Dorset and Bournemouth Constabulary
East Riding Constabulary; to York and North East Yorkshire Police
East Suffolk Constabulary; to Suffolk Constabulary
East Sussex Constabulary; to Sussex Constabulary
Essex Constabulary; to Essex and Southend-on-Sea Joint Constabulary
Glamorgan Constabulary; to South Wales Constabulary
Herefordshire Constabulary; to West Mercia Constabulary
Huntingdonshire Constabulary; to Mid Anglia Constabulary
Isle of Ely Constabulary; to Mid Anglia Constabulary
Leicestershire and Rutland Constabulary; to Leicester and Rutland Constabulary
Mid Wales Constabulary; to Dyfed-Powys Constabulary
Monmouthshire Constabulary; to Gwent Constabulary
North Riding Constabulary; to York and North East Yorkshire Police
Northamptonshire Constabulary; to Northampton and County Constabulary
Northumberland County Constabulary; to Northumberland Constabulary
Nottinghamshire Constabulary; to Nottinghamshire Combined Constabulary
Peterborough Combined Police Force; to Mid Anglia Constabulary
Oxfordshire Constabulary; to Thames Valley Constabulary
Shropshire Constabulary; to West Mercia Constabulary
Somerset Constabulary; to Somerset and Bath Constabulary
Staffordshire Constabulary; to Staffordshire County and Stoke-on-Trent Constabulary
West Riding Constabulary; to West Yorkshire Constabulary
West Suffolk Constabulary; to Suffolk Constabulary
West Sussex Constabulary; to Sussex Constabulary
Warwickshire Constabulary; to Warwickshire and Coventry Constabulary
Worcestershire Constabulary; to West Mercia Constabulary

Abolished by the Local Government Act 1972
All territorial police forces in England and Wales (except the Metropolitan Police and City of London Police) were abolished and reconstituted at midnight on 31 March 1974/1 April 1974.  This list shows the ones that existed then and their fate (ignoring minor transfers).

Bedfordshire and Luton Constabulary; reconstituted as Bedfordshire Police
Birmingham City Police; merged into West Midlands Police
Bradford City Police; merged into West Yorkshire Metropolitan Police
Bristol City Constabulary; merged into Avon and Somerset Constabulary
Cheshire Constabulary; reconstituted, areas transferred to Merseyside Police and Greater Manchester Police
Cumbria Constabulary; reconstituted
Derby County and Borough Constabulary; reconstituted as Derbyshire Constabulary
Devon and Cornwall Constabulary; reconstituted
Dorset and Bournemouth Constabulary; reconstituted as Dorset Police 
Durham Constabulary; reconstituted, areas transferred to Cleveland Constabulary and Northumbria Police
Dyfed-Powys Constabulary; reconstituted
Essex and Southend-on-Sea Joint Constabulary; reconstituted as Essex Police
Gloucestershire Constabulary; reconstituted, areas transferred to Avon and Somerset Constabulary
Gwent Constabulary; reconstituted
Gwynedd Constabulary; reconstituted as North Wales Police
Hampshire Constabulary; reconstituted, areas transferred to Dorset Police
Hertfordshire Constabulary; reconstituted
Kent County Constabulary; reconstituted
Kingston-upon-Hull City Police; merged into Humberside Police
Lancashire Constabulary; reconstituted, areas transferred to Merseyside Police, Greater Manchester Police, Cheshire Constabulary and Cumbria Constabulary
Leeds City Police; merged into West Yorkshire Metropolitan Police
Leicester and Rutland Constabulary; reconstituted as Leicestershire Constabulary
Lincolnshire Constabulary; reconstituted, areas transferred to Humberside Police
Liverpool and Bootle Constabulary; merged into Merseyside Police
Manchester and Salford Police; merged into Greater Manchester Police
Mid-Anglia Constabulary; reconstituted as Cambridgeshire Constabulary
Norfolk Constabulary; reconstituted
Northampton and County Constabulary; reconstituted as Northamptonshire Constabulary
Northumberland Constabulary; merged into Northumbria Police
Nottinghamshire Combined Constabulary; reconstituted as Nottinghamshire Police
Sheffield and Rotherham Constabulary; merged into South Yorkshire Police
Somerset and Bath Constabulary; merged into Avon and Somerset Constabulary
South Wales Constabulary; reconstituted
Staffordshire County and Stoke-on-Trent Constabulary; reconstituted as Staffordshire Police
Suffolk Constabulary; reconstituted
Surrey Constabulary; reconstituted
Sussex Constabulary; reconstituted
Teesside Constabulary; merged into Cleveland Constabulary
Thames Valley Constabulary; reconstituted
Warwickshire and Coventry Constabulary; split between Warwickshire Constabulary and West Midlands Police
West Mercia Constabulary; reconstituted
West Midlands Constabulary; merged into West Midlands Police
West Yorkshire Constabulary; split mainly between West Yorkshire Metropolitan Police, South Yorkshire Police and North Yorkshire Police
Wiltshire Constabulary; reconstituted
York and North East Yorkshire Police; split between North Yorkshire Police, Humberside Police, Durham Constabulary and Cleveland Constabulary.

Irish police forces
The partition of Ireland under the terms of the Government of Ireland Act 1920 and the subsequent independence of the Irish Free State in 1922 led to the replacement of the Royal Irish Constabulary with the Garda Síochána (in the Free State, later Éire or Republic of Ireland) and by the Royal Ulster Constabulary (in Northern Ireland). Defunct police forces in Ireland:
 Royal Irish Constabulary (RIC) - replaced in 1922 by the Garda Síochána and the Royal Ulster Constabulary
 Belfast Town Police - absorbed into the Royal Irish Constabulary in 1865
 Londonderry Borough Police - absorbed into the Royal Irish Constabulary in 1870
 Dublin Metropolitan Police (DMP) - authority transferred to the Irish Free State in 1922; absorbed into the Garda Síochána in 1925
 Royal Ulster Constabulary (RUC) - dissolved in 2001, replaced by the Police Service of Northern Ireland
 Ulster Special Constabulary (USC or "B Specials") - replaced by the Ulster Defence Regiment and the RUC Reserve in 1970)

Scottish police forces
Each police burgh had a police force originally, although many merged in the 19th century. The gradual process of amalgamation culminated with the creation of a single Police Service of Scotland in 2013.

Abolished 1930
The Local Government (Scotland) Act 1929 merged two pairs of county constabularies.
Kinross-shire County Constabulary to Perthshire and Kinross-shire Constabulary
Morayshire County Constabulary to Moray and Nairn Constabulary
Nairnshire Constabulary to Moray and Nairn Constabulary
Perthshire County Constabulary to Perthshire and Kinross-shire Constabulary
 
Abolished 1931–1946
Lerwick Burgh Police 29 May 1940 to Zetland Constabulary
Zetland County Police 29 May 1940 to Zetland Constabulary

Abolished under the Police (Scotland) Act 1946
Aberdeenshire Constabulary 16 May 1949 to Scottish North Eastern Counties Constabulary
Banffshire Constabulary 16 May 1949 to Scottish North Eastern Counties Constabulary
Berwickshire Constabulary to Berwick, Roxburgh and Selkirk Constabulary
Bute County Constabulary to Renfrew and Bute Constabulary
Clackmannanshire Constabulary 1949 to Strling and Clackmannan Constabulary
Dumfriesshire County Police 16 February 1948 to Dumfries and Galloway Constabulary
Dunfermline City Police 16 May 1949 to Fife Constabulary
East Lothian Constabulary to Lothians and Peeblesshire Constabulary
Fife County Constabulary 16 May 1949 to Fife Constabulary
Kincardineshire Constabulary 16 May 1949 to Scottish North Eastern Counties Constabulary
Kirkcaldy Burgh Police 16 May 1949 to Fife Constabulary
Midlothian Constabulary to Lothians and Peeblesshire Constabulary
Moray and Nairn Constabulary 16 May 1949 to Scottish North Eastern Counties Constabulary
Peeblesshire Constabulary to Lothians and Peeblesshire Constabulary
Renfrewshire Constabulary to Renfrew and Bute Constabulary
Roxburghshire Constabulary to Berwick, Roxburgh and Selkirk Constabulary
Selkirkshire constabulary to Berwick, Roxburgh and Selkirk Constabulary
Stewartry of Kirkcudbright Police 16 February 1948 to Dumfries and Galloway Constabulary
Stirlingshire Constabulary 1949 to Strling and Clackmannan Constabulary
West Lothian Constabulary to Lothians and Peeblesshire Constabulary
Wigtownshire County Police 16 February 1948 to Dumfries and Galloway Constabulary

Abolished 1950s
Dumbarton Burgh Police 1959 to Dunbartonshire Constabulary
Dunbarton County Constabulary 1959 to Dunbartonshire Constabulary

Abolished 1960s
Caithness Constabulary 1969 to Northern Constabulary
Coatbridge Burgh Police 1967 merged into Lanarkshire Constabulary
Greenock Burgh Police to Renfrew and Bute Constabulary
Inverness Burgh Police 16 November 1969 to Inverness Constabulary
Inverness-shire County Constabulary 16 November 1969 to Inverness Constabulary
Kilmarnock Burgh Police to Ayrshire Constabulary
Orkney Constabulary 1969 to Northern Constabulary
Perth City Police 1964 to Perth and Kinross Constabulary
Perthshire and Kinross-shire Constabulary 1964 to Perth and Kinross Constabulary
Ross and Cromarty Constabulary 1963 to Ross and Sutherland Constabulary
Sutherland Constabulary 1963 to Ross and Sutherland Constabulary
Zetland Constabulary 1969 to Northern Constabulary

Abolished 1975
The Local Government (Scotland) Act 1973 created new police forces based on the new regions and island areas from 16 May 1975.

Aberdeen City Police to Grampian Police
Angus Constabulary to Tayside Police
Argyll County Police to Strathclyde Police, part to Northern Constabulary
Ayrshire Constabulary to Strathclyde Police
Berwick, Roxburgh and Selkirk Constabulary to Lothian and Borders Police
City of Glasgow Police to Strathclyde Police
Dunbartonshire Constabulary to Strathclyde Police
Dundee City Police to Tayside Police
Edinburgh City Police to Lothian and Borders Police
Inverness Constabulary to Northern Constabulary
Lanarkshire Constabulary to Strathclyde Police
The Lothians and Peebles Constabulary to Lothian and Borders Police
Northern Constabulary (name retained by its successor after merger)
Perth and Kinross Constabulary most to Tayside Police to Central Scotland Police
Renfrew and Bute Constabulary to Strathclyde Police
Ross and Sutherland Constabulary to Northern Constabulary
Scottish North Eastern Counties Constabulary to Grampian Police, part to Northern Constabulary
Stirling and Clackmannan Police to Central Scotland Police, part to Strathclyde Police

Abolished 2013
An Act of the Scottish Parliament, the Police and Fire Reform (Scotland) Act 2012, created a single Police Service of Scotland – better known as Police Scotland – and a single Scottish Fire and Rescue Service with effect from 1 April 2013. (The functions of the British Transport Police, the Civil Nuclear Constabulary and the Ministry of Defence Police within Scotland were not affected).

Central Scotland Police to Police Scotland
Dumfries and Galloway Constabulary to Police Scotland
Fife Constabulary to Police Scotland
Grampian Police to Police Scotland
Lothian and Borders Police to Police Scotland
Northern Constabulary to Police Scotland
Scottish Crime and Drug Enforcement Agency to Police Scotland
Strathclyde Police to Police Scotland
Tayside Police to Police Scotland

Railway police forces 
From the archives of the British Transport Police:
Birmingham and Derby Railway Police (1836)
Birmingham and Gloucester Railway Police (1836)
Bristol & Exeter Railway Police (1836–1876)
Bristol Joint Railway Station Police (1865–1948)
Caledonian Railway Police (1845–1922)
Cambrian Railways Police (1867–1923)
Cardiff Railway Police (1897–1921)
Cheshire Line Committee Police (1865–1948)
Dundee and Arbroath Railway Police (1836–1923)
Eastern Counties Railway Police (1836–1862)
Eastern Union Railway Police (1847–1862)
East Lincolnshire Railway Police (1848)
Festiniog Railway Police (1884)
Furness Railway Police (1844–1922)
Great Central Railway Police (1897–1923)
Great Eastern Railway Police (1862–1923)
Great Northern Railway Police (1848–1923)
Great Western Railway Police (1835–1947)
Hull and Barnsley Railway Police (1885 – 1922, became part of (North Eastern Railway Police)
Hull and Selby Railway Police (1836/1854 – 1872, became part of North Eastern Railway Police)
Lancashire & Yorkshire Railway Police (1833–1846)
Lancaster and Carlisle Railway Police (1844–1879, became part of London & North Western Railway Police)
London & Birmingham Railway Police (1833–1846)
London, Brighton and South Coast Railway Police (1846–1923)
London & Croydon Railway Police (1835–1846)
London & Greenwich Railway Police (1833–1844)
London, Midland and Scottish Railway Police (1923–1948)
London & North Eastern Railway Police (1923–1948)
London & North Western Railway Police (1846–1923)
London and Southampton Railway Police (1838–1839)
London & South West Railway Police (1839–1923)
London, Tilbury & Southend Railway Police (1854–1912, became part of Midland Railway Police)
London Transport Police (April 1934 – 1 December 1958, became part of British Transport Commission)
London Underground Railways (13 April 1933–?, became part of London Transport Police)
Manchester & Leeds Railway Police (1837–1847)
Manchester, Sheffield & Lincolnshire Railway Police (1836–1844)
Midland Counties Railway Police (1836–1844)
Newcastle & North Shields Railway Police (1839 – )
North British Railway Police (1840–1844)
Northern & Eastern Counties Railway Police (1840–1844)
North Eastern Railway Police (1854–1923)
North Staffordshire Railway Police (1845–1923)
Pembroke and Tenby Railway Police (1859–1897)
Stockton & Darlington Railway Police (1846–1876)
South Devon Railway Police (1846–1876)
South Eastern Railway Police (1836–1898)
Southern Railway Police (1923–1948)
South Eastern & Chatham Railway Police (1898–1923)
South Wales Railway Police (1845–1863)
Taff Vale Railway Police (1919–1923)
York, North Midland Railway Police (1839–1854)

Docks and port police forces 
 Aberdeen Harbour Police
 Barry Docks Police (1884–1922)
 Boston Docks Police 1922 – 1963
 Bute Dock Police (1865–1922, merged with Great Western Railway Police)
 Commercial Docks Police (1810–1865, became part of Surrey Commercial Docks Police)
 Glasgow Marine Police (part of City of Glasgow Police)
 Dover Harbour Board Police - now renamed the Port of Dover Police
 Gloucester Dock Police (26 February 1836 – 25 November 1874, became part of Sharpness Dock Police)
 Gloucester and Berkley Docks Police (1827–1948)
 Greenock Harbour Police (1817 – ?, became part of Greenock Burgh Police)
 Grimsby Docks Police
 Hull Docks Police (1840–1893, became part of North Eastern Railway Police)
 Isle of Man Harbour Police
 Jersey Harbour Police
 Kingstown Harbour Police (1836–1924, became part of Dun Laoghaire Harbour Police)
 Larne Harbour Police (1877–2014)
 London and India Docks Police
 Londonderry Harbour Police (1858–?)
 Manchester Ship Canal Police (1893–1993)
 Newport Harbour Police
 Port of London Authority Police (1909–28 February 1992, became Port of Tilbury Police)
 Southampton Harbour Board Police (1847–1980)
 Swansea Harbour Trust Police (?–1923, merged with Great Western Railway Police)
 Tyne Improvement Commission Docks and Piers Police (?–1949)

Canal/river police forces 
Aberdare Canal Police (c.1846)
Aire and Calder Navigation Police (1840–1948)
Birmingham Canal Navigation Police (pre 1917 – 1948)
Bristol River Police
Gloucester Dock Police (1836–1874)
Grand Junction Canal Police
Grand Surrey Canal Police (1809 – 1855, became Grand Surrey Docks & Canal Police)
Grand Surrey Docks & Canal Police (1855 – 1865, became part of Surrey Commercial Docks Police)
Grand Union Canal Company Police (1929–1948)
Lee Conservancy Police (1871–1948)
Leeds and Liverpool Canal Police (1840 – ?)
Manchester Ship Canal Police (1893–1993)
Regents Canal and Dock Police (c.1840 – 1929)
River Clyde Police (1858 – 1866, merged into City of Glasgow Police to become the Marine Division)
River Tyne Police
Sharpness Dock Police (1874–1948)
Sheffield and South Yorkshire Navigation Police (1895 – ?)

Airport police forces

Aberdeen Airport Police
Birmingham Airport Police 
British Airports Authority Constabulary
East Midlands Airport Police
Glasgow Airport Police (1966–1974)
Isle of Man Airport Police – refounded 2007
Liverpool Airport Police
Luton Airport Police
Manchester Airport Police
Ministry of Civil Aviation Constabulary
Newcastle Airport Police
Southend-on-Sea Airport Police
Teesside Airport Police

Other police forces

Churches
 Hereford Cathedral Close Constable
 Lichfield Cathedral Close Constable
 Metropolitan Tabernacle Police
 Salisbury Cathedral Constables (1611–1836; constables continued to be appointed until 2010)

Departmental constabularies
Merged to form the Admiralty Constabulary in 1949.
 Royal Marine Police
 Royal Marine Police Reserve
 Admiralty Civil Police

Merged to form the Ministry of Defence Police in 1974.
 Admiralty Constabulary
 Air Force Department Constabulary
Air Ministry Constabulary – merged into Air Force Department Constabulary 1964
 Army Department Constabulary

Markets
 Birmingham Market Police
 Liverpool Markets Police
 Manchester Market Police

Miscellaneous
 British Legion Volunteer Police Force
 Eton College Police (1859–1892)
 Oxford University Police
 Cambridge University Constabulary

National
 National Crime Squad
 National Criminal Intelligence Service
 UK Atomic Energy Authority Constabulary (reconstituted as Civil Nuclear Constabulary)

Parks

London
 Barking and Dagenham Parks Constabulary
 Brent Parks Constabulary
 Greenwich Parks Constabulary
 Haringey Parks Constabulary
 London County Council Parks Police (1889–1908)
 Newham Community Constabulary (1998–2009)
 Redbridge Parks Police
 Royal Parks Constabulary – abolished only in England and Wales
 Southwark Parks Constabulary
 Sutton Parks Constabulary

Non-London
 Brighton Parks Police (1963–1990s)
 Birmingham Parks Police (1912–1962)
 Liverpool Parks Police (1882–1972)
 Manchester Park Police (Manchester Recreational Services Department Police)
 Wirral Parks Police
Birkenhead Parks Police – became Wirral Parks Police in 1974

Non-police law enforcement agencies
 Assets Recovery Agency
 Border and Immigration Agency
 Her Majesty's Customs and Excise
 National Hi-Tech Crime Unit
 Waterguard

References

External links
Cleveland
Devon and Cornwall
Kent
Leicestershire
Thames Valley
West Midlands
West Yorkshire

Defunct law enforcement agencies of the United Kingdom
Defunct
 List of former police forces in the United Kingdom
Lists of law enforcement agencies
Law agencies defunct